Umang Singhar is an Indian politician. He is the forest minister of the Madhya pradesh Government in 2019-2020 Madhya Pradesh Legislative Assembly. He is a Member of the Madhya Pradesh Legislative Assembly representing Gandhwani for the Indian National Congress. He is known as a big Aadiwasi leader in the State of Madhya Pradesh.  He was first elected in the 2008 general election.

See also
Madhya Pradesh Legislative Assembly
2013 Madhya Pradesh Legislative Assembly election
2008 Madhya Pradesh Legislative Assembly election

References

Indian National Congress politicians from Madhya Pradesh
Living people
1974 births
People from Dhar
Madhya Pradesh MLAs 2008–2013
Madhya Pradesh MLAs 2013–2018
Madhya Pradesh MLAs 2018–2023